Nembrotha purpureolineata is a species of colourful sea slug, a dorid nudibranch, a marine gastropod mollusc in the family Polyceridae. Nembrotha rutilans, classified as a separate species until 2008, has now been reclassified as Nembrotha purpureolineata.

Taxonomy
Nembrotha purpureolineata was first described from a preserved specimen collected from Abrolhos Islands off Western Australia by O'Donoghue in 1924. The short colour description given is probably enough to identify it to be the same as Nembrotha rutilans (Pruvot-Fol, 1931). The description of this species was done purely from a painting of marine life on the Great Barrier Reef in a book by William Saville-Kent, (1893) and so the earlier name has been given precedence.

Distribution
This nudibranch occurs in the west of the tropical Indo-West Pacific Ocean.

Description
Nembrotha purpureolineata is a large pale-bodied dorid. Although the ground colour is a creamy white, this is mostly hidden by a large brown patch which covers most of the notum. Brown stripes usually run down the sides of the body and a brown band is found around the head and anterior part of the mantle. The rhinophores are red to orange-red. The foot is usually edged with purple, though this may only be rather faint. It may reach a total length of 120 mm. This species is easily confused with Nembrotha aurea and Nembrotha chamberlaini. All three species have a similar range of colour variation although N. aurea often has orange patches not present in Nembrotha purpureolineata.

Ecology
This species feeds on ascidians and tunicates. It has been seen feeding on the yellow-lined ascidian, Clavelina meridionalis.

References

Further reading

External links

 

Polyceridae
Gastropods described in 1924